Secretases are enzymes that "snip" pieces off a longer protein that is embedded in the cell membrane. Among other roles in the cell, secretases act on the amyloid-beta precursor protein (APP) to cleave the protein into three fragments.  Sequential cleavage by beta-secretase 1 (BACE) and gamma-secretase (γ-secretase) produces the amyloid-beta peptide fragment that aggregates into clumps called amyloid plaques in the brains affected by Alzheimer's disease.  If alpha-secretase (α-secretase) acts on APP first instead of BACE, no amyloid beta is formed because α-secretase recognizes a target protein sequence closer to the cell surface than BACE.  The non-pathogenic middle fragment formed by an α/γ cleavage sequence is called P3.

Structure
The structure of the three secretases varies widely.

 The α-secretase gene has not been conclusively identified but is believed to be a metalloproteinase.
 BACE is a transmembrane protein with an extracellular aspartic acid protease domain.
 γ-secretase is actually a protein complex containing presenilin, nicastrin, APH-1, and PEN-2. Presenilin is believed to harbor the protease domain and represents an important example of an uncommon type of protease that cleaves targets within the cell membrane.

Function
Besides their involvement in the pathogenesis of Alzheimer's, these proteins also have other functional roles in the cell.

γ-secretase plays a critical role in developmental signalling by the transmembrane receptor Notch, freeing the cytoplasmic tail of Notch to travel to the cell nucleus to act as a transcription factor.

Although BACE cleaves the extracellular domains of several transmembrane proteins, its physiological function remains unknown.

References

External links
 

Enzymes
Integral membrane proteins